Bahçelievler is a neighborhood in Çankaya District of Ankara, Turkey. The name means 'houses with gardens' in Turkish.

The neighborhood was known in the 1970s as a battleground for the right and left wing political factions. In particular, it is the place of the Bahçelievler massacre of 8 October 1978, when 7 students, members of the Workers' Party of Turkey, were killed by neo-fascists, see "Multi-party period of the Republic of Turkey".

Demographics

Places in Bahçelievler, Ankara
The main building of the Turkish National Library system (Milli Kütüphane Başkanlığı) is located here.
Bahcelievler Culture and Leisure Centre houses four movie theatres, one bowling hall and other facilities.
Bahcelievler Business Centre is a business and shopping centre of Ankara. It also houses three movie theatres and a number of cafes.
Ankara Ice Palace, an indoor ice arena, opened in 1989.

References

Populated places in Ankara Province
Neighbourhoods of Çankaya
Çankaya, Ankara